2006 Live is a live album by the Danish progressive metal band Royal Hunt, released on CD and DVD by Frontiers Records in 2006. It is the only official live recording with singer John West.

Track listing
All songs written by André Andersen.

Disc One
 "Paper Blood" – 06:26
 "Time" – 03:23
 "The Mission" – 06:36
 "Never Give Up" – 05:17
 "Can't Let Go" – 04:40
 "Last Goodbye" – 06:08
 "Follow Me" – 02:39
 "Cold City Lights" – 08:51

Disc Two
 "Martial Arts" (Instrumental) – 02:41
 "Surrender" – 05:15
 "Running Wild" – 04:58
 "Far Away" – 05:47
 "Lies" – 07:49
 "Wasted Time" – 06:29
 "Message to God" – 08:24
 "Epilogue" – 09:08
 "Long Way Home" (Acoustic studio track) – 04:39

Personnel
André Andersen – keyboards
John West – vocals
Marcus Jidell – guitars
Per Schelander – bass
Kenneth Olsen – drums
Maria McTurk – backing vocals

External links
Metal Archives page

Royal Hunt live albums
2006 live albums
Frontiers Records live albums
Frontiers Records video albums
2006 video albums
Royal Hunt video albums
Live video albums